Bernard Caprasse (born 24 January 1949) is a Belgian politician. He was governor of the province of Luxembourg from 1996 until 2016. He is a member of the Centre démocrate humaniste.

Biography
Caprasse was born on 24 January 1949 in Lierneux. He obtained a licentiate in law at the Université catholique de Louvain in 1972. He worked as a lawyer in Brussels from 1972 to 1975, and in Marche-en-Famenne between 1975 and 1996. He became governor of the province of Luxembourg on 4 June 1996.

In January 2015 he announced that he would retire early 2016. Olivier Schmitz was appointed by the Walloon Government as his successor, effective 1 February 2016.

References

1949 births
Living people
Centre démocrate humaniste politicians
Governors of Luxembourg (Belgium)
People from Liège Province
Université catholique de Louvain alumni
20th-century Belgian politicians
20th-century Belgian lawyers
21st-century Belgian politicians